Roller derby is governed by associations that cover different types of derby.  Outside the United States, national associations exist, or derby is recognised and supported by the nation's roller sport federation.

National roller derby associations
These associations promote the activities of their member leagues and offer support and advice to their members, but do not establish rules.

 Roller Derby Association of Canada (founded 2009 as Canadian Women's Roller Derby Association, 73 members)
 United Kingdom Roller Derby Association (established 2010, at least 14 members)

National skate federations supporting roller derby
Outside of the United States many roller derby leagues enjoy support from their national skate federations such as the Skate Australia, the British Roller Sports Federation and Roller Sports Canada. USA Roller Sports (USARS) is recognized by the International Roller Sports Federation (FIRS) and the United States Olympic Committee (USOC) as the National Governing Body of competitive roller sports in the United States, including speed, figure, hockey, and slalom. Affiliation with a national organization was rejected by some American leagues who prefer governance on a grass roots level, but the WFTDA and USARS have a reciprocity agreement for insurance purposes.

American-based associations
This is a list of American-based roller derby associations. These associations establish rules and promote the activities of their member leagues. They are listed in alphabetical order.

 Junior Roller Derby Association (established 2009, 139 member leagues as of Dec 2017)
 Men's Roller Derby Association (established 2007, at least 18 members)
 Modern Athletic Derby Endeavor (established 2009, at least 20 members)
 Old School Derby Association (established 2007, at least 6 members)
 Renegade Rollergirls (established 2004, 7 members) 
 Roller Derby Coalition of Leagues (established 2011, 8 members)
 USA Roller Sports (founded 1937, 10 known active leagues using rules set as of Dec 2017)
 Women's Flat Track Derby Association (established 2004, 402 Full Member Leagues and 57 Apprentice leagues as of December 2017)
 World Organization of Roller Derby (established 2009)

Notes

References

Roller derby
Roller skating organizations